

Æthelmod was a medieval Bishop of Sherborne.

Æthelmod was consecrated between 766 and 774. He died between 789 and 794.

Citations

References

External links
 

Bishops of Sherborne (ancient)
8th-century deaths
8th-century English bishops
Year of birth unknown